Martine Blanc (born 16 September 1944 in Clermont-Ferrand, Puy-de-Dôme) is a French author and illustrator of ten books for children including The story of Timothy, the Two Hoots series in collaboration with Helen Cresswell, and All about Jesus.

Education 
Blanc holds a degree in architecture from the École Nationale Supérieure des Beaux-Arts of Paris, France.

Career 
In 1970s, Blanc started her writing career as a children's book author. Blanc's illustrations are also displayed in her children books and the Two Hoots series written by Helen Cresswell, a TV scriptwriter and children author. In addition, Blanc is also credited in the animation department of an animation 1993 film David Copperfield.

Filmography 
 1987 The Big Bang – as production administrator.
 1993 David Copperfield – as layout and posing administrator.

Works

Timothy 
 The story of Timothy, Ernest Benn Limited, London, 1972
 Hyacinthe, Ernest Benn Limited, London, 1976
The character Timothy has led to an important merchandising in Japan (dolls, watches, tee-shirts...).

The Two Hoots series (text from Helen Cresswell)
 Two Hoots, Ernest Benn Limited, London, 1974 
 Two Hoots go to the sea, Ernest Benn Limited, London, 1974 
 Two Hoots and the Big Bad Bird, Ernest Benn Limited, London, 1975 
 Two Hoots in the Snow, Ernest Benn Limited, London, 1975 
 Two Hoots Play Hide-And Seek, Ernest Benn Limited, London, 1977 
 Two Hoots and the King, Ernest Benn Limited, London, 1977

Pelé, Velu et Dodue 
 Pelé, Velu et Dodue , Fernand Nathan, Paris, 1980

All about Jesus
  All about Jesus: The Life and Teachings of Jesus in the Bible's Own Words, Loyola Press, 2000

References

External links
 Martine Blanc at Goodreads.com
 Martine Blanc at jacketflap.com

1944 births
École des Beaux-Arts alumni
Living people
Artists from Clermont-Ferrand
French children's writers
French children's book illustrators
20th-century French women writers
21st-century French women writers
French women children's writers
French illustrators
French women illustrators
Writers from Clermont-Ferrand